SM Seaside Arena is a multipurpose indoor arena that  is under construction in South Road Properties, Cebu City, Philippines. The arena, located adjacent to the SM Seaside complex, is estimated to have a 16,000-seating capacity and, once completed, will be the largest indoor arena in Cebu.

First proposed in 2013, the arena is planned to be a venue for local and international concerts, sports events, international conventions, and being the venue of the Cebu Schools Athletic Foundation, Inc. (CESAFI) and some select Philippine Basketball Association (PBA) games. The area was one of the proposed venues for the failed Philippine bid for the 2019 FIBA Basketball World Cup.

In January 2017, developer SM Prime Holdings reportedly canceled its plans to build the arena. However, plans for the arena resumed in late 2019, with the arena, instead of being within the SM Seaside complex, now placed within South Coast City, an adjacent mixed-use development co-owned by SM Prime with Ayala Land.

References

External links

Basketball venues in the Philippines
Buildings and structures in Cebu City
Indoor arenas in the Philippines
Indoor arenas under construction
Proposed indoor arenas
SM Prime
Volleyball venues in the Philippines